James Smith House may refer to:

in the United States (by state)
 James Smith House (Davenport, Iowa), listed on the National Register of Historic Places (NRHP)
James Smith Homestead, Kennebunk, Maine, listed on the NRHP in York County, Maine
 James Smith House (Needham, Massachusetts), NRHP-listed
 James Smith House (Grandin, Missouri), listed on the NRHP in Carter County, Missouri
 James Alexander Smith and Elmarion Smith Barn and Lame-Smith House, Halsey, Oregon, NRHP-listed

See also
Smith House (disambiguation)